Moldova has participated in the Eurovision Song Contest 17 times, debuting in . The country's best result is a third-place finish for SunStroke Project in 2017, with their song "Hey Mamma".

Moldova's debut in the contest in 2005 was successful, with Zdob și Zdub finishing sixth. The country also reached the top ten with Natalia Barbu, DoReDoS, and Zdob și Zdub and Advahov Brothers.

History

However, in response to public pressure, TRM filed the preliminary documents to compete and sent Natalia Barbu with song "Fight". She achieved 10th place.

In 2008 Moldova, for the first time in 4 years of participating, failed to make the Final, their jazz number, "A Century of Love", finishing 12th place in a field of 19.
In 2009 Moldova achieved 14th place with Nelly Ciobanu.
In 2010, saxophonist Sergey Stepanov of SunStroke Project became the internet phenomenon ("Epic Sax Guy") with his 30-second saxophone solo.

In 2011 Zdob și Zdub represented Moldova for a second time in the contest, with the song So Lucky placing 12th in the final. This was the third time that Moldova ended up 10th in the semifinal, the last qualifier for the final.
In 2012 and 2013 Moldova achieved 11th place with Pasha Parfeny and Aliona Moon respectively.

In 2014-2016 Moldova failed to qualify for the final coming last in 2014, 11th in 2015 and pre-last in 2016.
In 2017, Moldova achieved its best result at the contest, when SunStroke Project finished third in the final with the song "Hey, Mamma!". The streak of top 10 results continued in 2018 with the band DoReDos finishing 10th in Lisbon. However in 2019, Moldova failed to qualify for the first time since 2016, finishing 12th in the semi-final.

In 2020, Natalia Gordienko, who represented Moldova in 2006, was set to represent the country with the song "Prison", however the contest was cancelled due to COVID-19 pandemic. She instead represented Moldova in 2021 with the song "Sugar". She eventually qualified to the grand final and achieved a 13th place with 115 points. Her 17-second note at the end of "Sugar" was reported to be the longest note in Eurovision history.

Participation overview

Commentators and spokespersons
For the show's broadcast on TRM, various commentators have provided commentary on the contest in the Romanian language. At the Eurovision Song Contest after all points are calculated, the presenters of the show call upon each voting country to invite each respective spokesperson to announce the results of their vote on-screen.

Photo gallery

See also
Moldova in the Junior Eurovision Song Contest
Moldova in the Turkvision Song Contest
Gagauzia in the Turkvision Song Contest

Notes

References

External links
 Points to and from Moldova eurovisioncovers.co.uk

 
Countries in the Eurovision Song Contest